Tennis was contested at the 1962 Asian Games inside the Asian Games Complex in Jakarta, Indonesia. Tennis had doubles and singles events for men and women, as well as a mixed doubles competition. The venues used were the Senayan Tennis Stadium, now known as the Center Court, and the now-demolished open courts located south of the stadium. The courts are now replaced by a baseball stadium.

Japan and the Philippines dominated the events winning all seven gold medals.

Medalists

Medal table

See also
 Tennis at the Asian Games

References

 Asian Games Roll of Honour (1962-2006)

External links
 OCA website

 
1962 Asian Games events
1962
Asian Games
1962 Asian Games